The 2021 Lebanese blackout was a power outage in Lebanon that started on 9 October 2021, after two of the country’s power plants shut down when they ran out of diesel fuel. The two power stations provided 40% of Lebanon's electricity. Due to this, the power grid was shut down nationwide. The outage ended on 10 October, 24 hours after the start.

Background 
Because of the ongoing Lebanese liquidity crisis, the Lebanese pound lost over 90% of its value, leaving the government unable to pay for fuel imports, resulting in a general shortage of fuel in Lebanon, including for its power plants. The fuel shortage also meant that people and businesses could not run their private fuel-powered electricity generators.

Outage 
The power outage started on 9 October, after the Zahrani power station ran out of fuel. The day before, the Deir Ammar station had also stopped running for the same reason. With both plants shut down, national power production was limited to 270 megawatts, making the grid severely unstable, so that the grid was shut down nation-wide at noon that day. Power had not been expected to come back on for several days, although that turned out to be wrong.

On 10 October, Banque du Liban, Lebanon’s central bank, released $100 million in foreign currency to the Lebanese Energy Ministry to enable it to import fuel. In the meantime, the Lebanese army delivered 6,000 kilolitres (1.6 million gallons) of diesel fuel to both of the two power plants, and power was restored that day, after 24 hours of the blackout.
On 8 January 2022, EDL reported a total blackout across Lebanese territory as of 17:27 (1527 GMT).

Protests 
Protests took place in Halba outside the offices of Électricité du Liban, the state-owned power company, as well as protesters blocking roads with burning tires in Tripoli.

See also
 Energy in Lebanon
 Energy crisis

References 

2021 in Lebanon
Electric power in Lebanon
October 2021 events in Asia
Energy crises